Thomas Willis Cobb (1784February 1, 1830) was a United States representative and Senator from Georgia.

Biography
Born in Columbia County, Georgia, he pursued preparatory studies, and studied law. He was admitted to the bar and practiced in Lexington, Georgia. He moved to Greensboro and was elected as a Representative to the Fifteenth and Sixteenth Congresses, serving from March 4, 1817, to March 3, 1821. He was an unsuccessful candidate for reelection to the Seventeenth Congress, but was elected to the Eighteenth Congress and served from March 4, 1823, to December 6, 1824, when he resigned, having been elected to the U.S. Senate; while a Representative during the Eighteenth Congress, he was chairman of the Committee on Public Expenditures. He was elected to the Senate to fill the vacancy caused by the death of Nicholas Ware and served from December 6, 1824, until his resignation in 1828. He was a judge of the superior court of Georgia, and died in Greensboro in 1830. Cobb County, Georgia is named in his honor and its county seat, Marietta, is named for his wife Mary. He was a slaveowner and the cousin of Confederate Generals Thomas Reade Rootes Cobb and Howell Cobb.

References

External links

 

1784 births
1830 deaths
People from Columbia County, Georgia
American people of English descent
Democratic-Republican Party members of the United States House of Representatives from Georgia (U.S. state)
Democratic-Republican Party United States senators from Georgia (U.S. state)
Jacksonian United States senators from Georgia (U.S. state)
Georgia (U.S. state) Jacksonians
Georgia (U.S. state) state court judges
Cobb County, Georgia
People from Lexington, Georgia
People from Greensboro, Georgia
American slave owners
Georgia (U.S. state) lawyers
19th-century American judges
United States senators who owned slaves